Omm ol Ghezlan (also Romanized as Omm ol Ghezlān and Omm ol Ghazlān) is a village in Darkhoveyn Rural District, in the Central District of Shadegan County, Khuzestan Province, Iran. At the 2006 census, its population was 872, in 121 families.

References 

Populated places in Shadegan County